Fauji Fertilizer Company Limited (FFC) is a Pakistani chemical company which produces chemical fertilizer. It was established by the Fauji Foundation which holds a controlling interest. FFC produces or markets various fertilizers which include urea, DAP, SOP (Sulphate of Potash), MOP (Muriate of Potash), Boron (Di-Sodium Tetra Borate Decahydrate) and Zinc (Zinc Sulfate Mono-hydrate).

FFC markets it products as "Sona". Sona is an Urdu language word, meaning gold.

History

The Beginning (1978-1993): Plant-I & Plant-II
Fauji Fertilizer Company Limited (FFC) is the largest urea manufacturer in Pakistan.  It was incorporated in 1978 as a joint venture between Fauji Foundation (a leading charitable trust in Pakistan) and Haldor Topsoe of Denmark.  The first urea complex was commissioned in 1982 in Sadiqabad, Punjab. To keep up with the Urea demand in the country, a second plant was built at the same location in 1993.

Fauji Fertilizer Bin Qasim Limited
FFC participated as a major shareholder in a new DAP/Urea manufacturing complex with participation of major international/national institutions. The new company Fauji Fertilizer Bin Qasim Limited (formerly FFC-Jordan Fertilizer Company Limited) commenced commercial production with effect from January 1, 2000. The facility was designed with an annual capacity of 551,000 metric tons of urea and 445,500 metric tons of DAP, revamped to 670,000 metric tons of DAP.

2002: Acquisition of PSFL, now FFC Plant-III
Expanding further, in the year 2002, FFC acquired ex Pak Saudi Fertilizers Limited (PSFL) Urea Plant situated at Mirpur Mathelo, District Ghotki from National Fertilizer Corporation (NFC) through a privatisation process of the Government of Pakistan. At that time, this acquisition at Rs. 8,151 million represented one of the largest industrial sector transactions in Pakistan.

After PSFL's acquisition, FFC's Marketing Group became the largest fertilizer marketing network in the Country. It markets nearly 3.4 million metric tonnes of fertilizer per annum for both FFC and FFBL under brand name "SONA UREA".

Diversification: Food, Energy and Financial Sectors
Following its diversification policy, FFC ventured into financial services and food businesses during 2013, and acquired 43.15% equity stake of Askari Bank (AKBL) with a total investment of Rs. 10.46 billion.

FFC also acquired 100% equity of Al-Hamd Foods Limited in October 2013 as a platform to enter the Foods Business. Post acquisition, the company was renamed as Fauji Fresh 'n' Freeze Limited.

The company has also pioneered towards landmark Wind Power Plants in Pakistan with a view to enhance the country's energy security through green and clean power. Towards this objective, FFCEL, FFC 100% owned subsidiary, is the first wind farm project of the country, with a capacity of 49.50 MWh.

In 2018, FFC expanded energy business further and entered in a joint venture with HUBCO by investing US$39 Million in Thar Energy Limited (TEL) for an equity share of 30%. TEL, a coal based power company, is expected to start production in 2021. 

FFC holds 49.88% stake in FFBL and 6.79% stake in Fauji Cement Company Limited.  Besides it holds 12.5% stake in Pakistan Maroc Phosphore SA (PMP) in Morocco which meets the entire raw material requirement of FFBL's DAP production.

Awards

Karachi Stock Exchange top 25 companies awards
The company was listed on the Karachi Stock Exchange in 1991. Based on the exemplary dividends to the shareholders and other criteria of Karachi Stock Exchange, FFC has consistently remained in the list of top 25 best performing companies of Pakistan consecutively for 14 years since 1994.
As a result of excellent performance over the years, the company's ranking in the Karachi Stock Exchange list of 25 companies improved from fifth position in 1995 to second in 1996, it was awarded the first position in 1997 and again second prize in 1998. As of 2011, the company is at the first position in the fertilizer field in Pakistan.

Accounts awards 
The company has also won numerous "Best presented accounts awards" from different national and international organizations including Institute of Chartered Accountants of Pakistan, ICMAP, SAFA. The company also held first position in the overall category of Best Presented Accounts for the years 2002-2007

Internationally, FFC is well recognized as a member of International Fertilizer Industry Association (IFA), Arab Fertilizer Association (AFA) and United Nations Global Compact (UNGC) New York, USA.

Gallery

References

External links 
 Fauji Fertilizer Company Limited

Fauji Foundation
Companies listed on the Pakistan Stock Exchange
Pakistani brands
Companies based in Rawalpindi
Chemical companies established in 1978
Pakistani companies established in 1978
Fertilizer companies of Pakistan